The Darwin Lagrangian (named after Charles Galton Darwin, grandson of the naturalist) describes the interaction to order  between two charged particles in a vacuum and is given by

where the free particle Lagrangian is

and the interaction Lagrangian is

where the Coulomb interaction is

and the Darwin interaction is

The free Lagrangian is the Taylor expansion of free Lagrangian of two relativistic particles to second order in v. The Darwin interaction term is due to one particle reacting to the magnetic field generated by the other particle. In that case retardation effects must be accounted for.

Derivation in vacuum
The relativistic interaction Lagrangian for a particle with charge q interacting with an electromagnetic field is

where  is the relativistic velocity of the particle. The first term on the right generates the Coulomb interaction. The second term generates the Darwin interaction.

The vector potential in the Coulomb gauge is described by (Gaussian units)

where the transverse current  is the solenoidal current (see Helmholtz decomposition) generated by a second particle. The divergence of the transverse current is zero.

The current generated by the second particle is

which has a Fourier transform

The transverse component of the current is

It is easily verified that

which must be true if the divergence of the transverse current is zero.

From the equation for the vector potential, the Fourier transform of the vector potential is

The inverse Fourier transform of the vector potential is

where

(see ).

The Darwin interaction term in the Lagrangian is then

Lagrangian equations of motion
The equation of motion for one of the particles is

where  is the momentum of the particle.

Free particle
The equation of motion for a free particle neglecting interactions between the two particles is

Interacting particles
For interacting particles, the equation of motion becomes

Hamiltonian for two particles in a vacuum
The Darwin Hamiltonian for two particles in a vacuum is related to the Lagrangian by a Legendre transformation

The Hamiltonian becomes

Hamiltonian equations of motion
The Hamiltonian equations of motion are

and

which yield

and

Note that the quantum mechanical Breit equation originally used the Darwin Lagrangian with the Darwin Hamiltonian as its classical starting point though the Breit equation would be better vindicated by the Wheeler–Feynman absorber theory and better yet quantum electrodynamics.

See also
 Static forces and virtual-particle exchange
 Breit equation
 Wheeler–Feynman absorber theory

References

Magnetostatics
Equations of physics